Bethlehem Library (Spanish: Parque Biblioteca Belén) is one of ten library parks in Medellín, Colombia, located in Comuna 16. The library was designed by Japanese architect Hiroshi Naito in collaboration with the University of Tokyo. It is named after its location in the Belén (Bethlehem) commune of Medellín.

The library park has public spaces with three different ambiances: a green plaza, a water plaza, and a plaza for the public.

History
Universities in Colombia began a program of sharing with the University of Tokyo in 2006. As part of this exchange, a group of architects from the University of Tokyo, under the direction of Hiroshi Naito, donated the design of Bethlehem Library.

References

External links
 Official Library Homepage (Spanish)

Libraries in Colombia
Buildings and structures in Medellín
Culture in Medellín
Libraries established in 2008
2008 establishments in Colombia